Tramea insularis, the Antillean saddlebags, is a species of skimmer in the family Libellulidae. It is found in the Caribbean, Central America, and North America.

The IUCN conservation status of Tramea insularis is "LC", least concern, with no immediate threat to the species' survival. The population is stable.

References

Further reading

 
 
 
 
 
 
 
 

Libellulidae
Articles created by Qbugbot
Insects described in 1861